Ponnur Hills is an area in the Tiruvannamalai district of Tamil Nadu in India.

Kunda Kunda, the Digambar Jain Acharya ( Principal Monk ) spent much time here. According to Jain beliefs, he visited Videha Kshetra and ascended to Heaven from here.

Tiruvannamalai district
Jain temples and tirthas
Tourist attractions in Tamil Nadu
Hills of Tamil Nadu
Religious buildings and structures in India
Religious buildings and structures in Tamil Nadu